Tallahassee Airport may refer to:

 Tallahassee Commercial Airport in Tallahassee, Florida, United States (FAA: 68J)
 Tallahassee International Airport in Tallahassee, Florida, United States (FAA: TLH)